Eliel Saarinen's Tribune Tower design or the Saarinen tower are terms used to describe the unnamed and unbuilt design for a skyscraper, created by Finnish architect Eliel Saarinen and submitted in 1922 for the Chicago Tribunes architectural competition for a new headquarters. The winning entry, the neo-Gothic Tribune Tower, was constructed in 1925. Saarinen's entry came in second place yet became influential in the design of a number of future buildings.

Background
In 1921–22, the prominent Tribune Tower competition was held to design a new headquarters for the Chicago Tribune, a major American metropolitan newspaper. It attracted 260 entries. First place was awarded to a design by New York architects John Mead Howells and Raymond Hood, a neo-Gothic building completed in 1925. Saarinen was awarded $20,000 for second place; his design was never constructed. Many observers felt that Saarinen's simplified yet soaring setback tower was the most appropriate entry, and his novel modernist design influenced many subsequent architectural projects.

Saarinen was a veteran architect but had never before designed a skyscraper. To arrive at his noteworthy design, he took as a starting place the upward sweep of Gothic architecture, but then advanced this sense of verticality as his primary design principle. He said that through "logical construction" each portion of the design was made to reflect the larger goal of verticality. He was 49 years old when he submitted the design; the next year he moved from Finland to the Chicago area. In the U.S., he contributed to an overall design for the Chicago lakefront, and he lectured at the University of Michigan, but none of his skyscraper designs were ever built. Instead, others found success by incorporating his vision. Tribune Tower competition co-winner Raymond Hood adopted Saarinen's skyscraper style for several of his subsequent projects, and Saarinen's design was emulated by other contemporary architects such as Timothy L. Pflueger, George W. Kelham, Hubbell and Benes, Holabird & Roche, Alfred C. Finn, and James Edwin Ruthven Carpenter, Jr., as well as later architect César Pelli.

Reception
Respected Chicago architect Louis Sullivan offered high praise to Saarinen's design, and said that his building indicated the future direction for the old Chicago School. Sullivan named Saarinen his stylistic successor. Chicago architects Thomas Tallmadge and Irving Kane Pond were also very vocal in their praise for Saarinen. Pond said Saarinen's design was by far the best contest entry, that it was devoid of the superficial adornments featured on the winning entry, and free of the "stranglehold of conventional forms." Tallmadge projected that Saarinen's design would be transformative for American skyscrapers. He said that under Saarinen's hand, the spirit of the skyscraper, "rid of its inhibitions and suppressed desires... leaps in joyous freedom to the sky."

Skyscraper Museum director Carol Willis, and art consultant Franck Mercurio, curator at the Field Museum in Chicago, offer moderating modern views about the influence of Saarinen's design. Willis notes that setback architecture was being implemented in New York City highrises because of 1916 zoning ordinances related to building height and sunlight, and that Saarinen's design was understood to be an embodiment of this trend. Mercurio points to the Tribune Tower competition entry from American architect Bertram Goodhue as having the same modernist features as Saarinen's, with dramatic setbacks but a more pronounced simplification of the exterior. Mercurio argues that Goodhue's design is a better example of modernism because it has less ornamentation. Goodhue's entry gained him honorable mention but no cash award.

Buildings influenced
The following buildings are regarded to have been influenced by Saarinen's 1922 design.

References

External links
The Chicago Tribune Competition, Skyscraper Museum

Buildings and structures by Finnish architects
Unbuilt buildings and structures in the United States
History of Chicago
1920s architecture in the United States
Art Deco architecture in Illinois